Jonel Désiré (born 12 February 1997) is a Haitian professional footballer who plays as a striker for Armenian Premier League club Pyunik and the Haiti national team.

Career
On 3 July 2018, Désiré signed a one-year contract, with the option of a second, with Armenian Premier League club Lori FC.
On 18 July 2019, Lori FC announced that they had failed to negotiate a deal to keep Désiré in Armenia, and he returned to AS Mirebalais.

On 31 August 2019, Lori announced the permanent signing of Désiré on a three-year contract for $60,000.

On 8 August 2020, Désiré moved from Lori to fellow Armenian Premier League club FC Urartu.

On 6 July 2022, Urartu announced that they had terminated their contract with Désiré by mutual agreement, with Olympiakos Nicosia announcing the singing of Désiré later the same day. In December 2022, Désiré left Olympiakos Nicosia citing personal reasons. On 11 January 2023, Désiré returned to the Armenian Premier League, signing for Pyunik.

Career statistics

Club

International

Scores and results list Haiti's goal tally first, score column indicates score after each Désiré goal.

References

External links
 
 

Living people
1997 births
Haitian footballers
Association football forwards
Haiti international footballers
Haiti under-20 international footballers
Haiti youth international footballers
2019 CONCACAF Gold Cup players
2015 CONCACAF U-20 Championship players
Real Monarchs players
FC Lori players
USL Championship players
Armenian Premier League players
Haitian expatriate footballers
Haitian expatriate sportspeople in Armenia
Expatriate footballers in Armenia
Haitian expatriate sportspeople in the United States
Expatriate soccer players in the United States
Olympiakos Nicosia players